Thomas Montgomery Bell (March 17, 1861 – March 18, 1941) was an American politician who served as House majority whip from 1913 to 1915.

Bell was born in Nacoochee Valley, near Cleveland, Georgia. He graduated from Moore's Business University at Atlanta, then taught public school in Cleveland from 1878 to 1879. He then worked as a traveling salesman for several years. He served as clerk of the superior court of Hall County, Georgia from 1898 to 1904, then was elected as a congress member in the Democratic Party of the United States, serving from March 4, 1905, to March 3, 1931. He served as majority whip from 1913 to 1915. In 1922, he was a prominent voice of  racist opposition to anti-lynching legislation, arguing that political equality for African Americans is "something that would never be tolerated and should never be advocated by anyone." After an unsuccessful renomination in 1930, he returned to the private sector and died in Gainesville, Georgia.

References

External links

1861 births
1941 deaths
People from White County, Georgia
Democratic Party members of the United States House of Representatives from Georgia (U.S. state)
People from Hall County, Georgia
People from Cleveland, Georgia